John Taylor (1816 – June 16, 1881) was a British-born merchant and political figure in Nova Scotia. He represented Halifax County in the Nova Scotia House of Assembly from 1873 to 1874 as a Liberal member.

He was born in Montrose. Taylor was involved in the West Indies trade. He was also president of Ocean Marine Insurance Association and served as a director for the Nova Scotia Mutual Fire Insurance Company and the Springhill and Parrsboro Coal and Railway Company. Taylor was elected to the provincial assembly in an 1873 by-election held after the death of William Garvie. He died in Halifax due to an accident.

References
A Directory of the Members of the Legislative Assembly of Nova Scotia, 1758-1958, Public Archives of Nova Scotia (1958)

1816 births
1881 deaths
Nova Scotia Liberal Party MLAs
People from Montrose, Angus